Premam Poojyam is a 2021 Indian Kannada romantic film written, directed, and co-produced by Dr. Raghavendra B S, making his debut. The film is being produced by Dr. Rakshith Kedambadi, Dr. Rajkumar Janakiraman, Dr. Raghavendra S, Manoj Krishnan under the banner Kedambadi Creations. It features Prem Kumar and Brinda Acharya along with Aindrita Ray in the lead roles. The supporting cast includes Master Anand, Anu Prabhakar and Avinash. The score and soundtrack for the film is by Dr. Raghavendra BS and the cinematography is by Naveen Kumar. The film received a positive response from both public and critics and it was declared as a hit at the box office.

Cast 

 Prem Kumar as Dr Srihari
 Aindrita Ray as Joyitha
 Brinda Acharya as Angel
 Master Anand
 Anu Prabhakar
 Avinash
 Dr.Deepthi
 Sadhu Kokila
 Suman
 T S Nagabharana

Production 
The film marked actor Prem's 25th film in his film career. The film had newbie Brinda Acharya and Aindrita Ray as the female leads. The film was shot in Bengaluru, Mysuru, and in other parts of Karnataka. The trailer of the film was released on 14 October 2021.

Release
The film was earlier slated to release on 29 October 2021  but to avoid the clash with Bhajarangi 2. The film was later slated to release on 12 November 2021.

Soundtrack 

The film's background score and the soundtracks are composed, written and sung by Dr Raghavendra B S . The music rights were acquired by Kedambi  Audio.

References

External links 

 

2020s Kannada-language films
Indian romance films
2021 directorial debut films
Films shot in Mysore
Films shot in Bangalore